Cupido lacturnus, the Indian Cupid, is a small butterfly found in the Australasian and Indomalayan realms that belongs to the lycaenids or blues family.

Description
Harry Tytler described C. l. assamica on 1915 as:

Subspecies
The subspecies of Cupido lacturnus are:

 Cupido lacturnus syntala Cantlie, 1963 – Gujarat southwards to Andhra Pradesh and Kerala.
 Cupido lacturnus assamica Tytler, 1915 – Himachal Pradesh to N.E. India; Uttar Pradesh and Bihar.
 Cupido lacturnus pila Evans, 1925 – Andamans & Nicobars Is. (All Nicobars).

References

Cupido (butterfly)
Butterflies of Singapore
Butterflies described in 1824